Dick CE. Davis (born November 28, 1946) is a former American football running back who played one season in the National Football League (NFL) with the Denver Broncos and New Orleans Saints. He was drafted by the Cleveland Browns in the twelfth round of the 1969 NFL Draft. He played college football at the University of Nebraska–Lincoln and attended Omaha North High School in Omaha, Nebraska.

References

External links
Just Sports Stats
Fanbase profile

Living people
1946 births
Players of American football from Nebraska
American football running backs
African-American players of American football
Nebraska Cornhuskers football players
Denver Broncos players
New Orleans Saints players
Sportspeople from Omaha, Nebraska
Omaha North High School alumni
21st-century African-American people
20th-century African-American sportspeople